is a private university in Nobeoka, Miyazaki, Japan, established in 1999.

History 

 January 1967 ( Showa 42) -- Authority for the establishment of Takaryo Gakuen School Corporation

Notes and references

External links
 Official website 

Educational institutions established in 1999
Private universities and colleges in Japan
Universities and colleges in Miyazaki Prefecture
1999 establishments in Japan